NGC 459, also known as UGC 832, MCG 3-4-17, ZWG 459.24, and PGC 4665, is a spiral galaxy in the constellation Pisces. It was discovered on October 15, 1784, by William Herschel. It was described as being extremely faint by John Dreyer in the New General Catalogue.

References

External links 
 

Barred spiral galaxies
Pisces (constellation)
0459
004665